Laoag, officially the City of Laoag, is a 3rd class component city and capital of the province of Ilocos Norte, Philippines.  According to the 2020 census, it has a population of 111,651 people.

It is the province's political, commercial, and industrial hub and the location of the Ilocos Region's busiest commercial airport.

The municipalities of San Nicolas, Paoay, Sarrat, Vintar, and Bacarra form its boundaries. The foothills of the Cordillera Central mountain range to the east, and the South China Sea to the west are its physical boundaries.

Laoag experiences the prevailing monsoon climate of Northern Luzon, characterized by a dry season from November to April and a wet season from May to October, occasionally visited by powerful typhoons.

History

Long before the coming of the Spaniards, there already existed an extensive region consisting of the present provinces of Ilocos Norte, Ilocos Sur, Abra, and La Union renowned for its gold mines.  Merchants from Japan and China would often visit the area to trade gold with beads, ceramics, and silk.  The Austronesian inhabitants of the region called their place samtoy, from sao mi itoy, which literally meant "this is our language."

In 1571, when the Spanish conquistadors had Manila more or less under their control, they began looking for new sites to conquer. Legaspi's grandson, Juan de Salcedo, volunteered to lead one of these expeditions.  Together with eight armed boats and 45 men, the 22-year-old voyager headed north.

On June 13, 1572, Salcedo and his men landed in Vigan and then proceeded towards Laoag, Currimao, and Badoc.  As they sailed along the coast, they were surprised to see numerous sheltered coves (looc) where the locals lived in harmony.  As a result, they named the region "Ylocos" and its people "Ylocanos".

As the Christianization of the region grew, so did the landscape of the area. In the town plaza, it was not uncommon to see garrisons under the church bells. The colonization process was slowly being carried out.

The Spanish colonization of the region, however, was never completely successful. Owing to the abusive practices of many Augustinian friars, a number of Ilocanos revolted against their colonizers. Noteworthy of these were the Dingras uprising (1589) and Pedro Almasan revolt in San Nicolas (1660). In 1762, Diego Silang led a series of battles aimed at freeing the Ilocanos from the Spanish yoke. When he died from an assassin's bullet, his widow Gabriela continued the cause. Unfortunately, she too was captured and hanged. In 1807, the sugar cane (basi) brewers of Piddig rose up in arms to protest the government's monopoly of the wine industry. In 1898, the church excommunicated Gregorio Aglipay for refusing to cut off ties with the revolutionary forces of Gen. Emilio Aguinaldo. Aglipay's movement and the national sentiment it espoused helped restore the self-respect of many Filipinos.

"The great increase in population from 1715 to 1818 from 18,980 to 282,845 made the administration of the province very difficult. Due to the excessive monopolies and forced labor, there were several uprisings: first by the people of Dingras in 1589; one that was led by Pedro Almazan in 1616; the revolt of Diego Silang in 1762–1763; by Ambaristo in 1788; by Pedro Mateo in 1808 (also known as Basi Revolt) and uprising of Sarrat in 1815. For this reason, the division of the Ilocos into two provinces was recommended by the local authorities. On February 2, 1818, a Spanish Royal Decree was promulgated dividing the Province of Ilocos Norte from Ilocos Sur. Laoag, which was then the biggest center of population, was made the capital of Ilocos Norte."

Laoag was captured by the Japanese Army on December 12, 1941, two days after the landing at Vigan and Aparri. Its airport was then used by the Japanese for most of World War II.

Cityhood

On June 19, 1965, Laoag changed from municipality to city status, following a plebiscite and passed into law by the Senate President Ferdinand Edralin Marcos. It remained the capital of Ilocos Norte. Mayor Eulalio F. Siazon and Engineer Trinidad Lucas Aurelio were part of a team that led the drive to convert Laoag into a city. Another members of the group was Simeon M. Valdez who filed the bill in congress, co-authored by Antonio V. Raquiza. The first city mayor was Eulalio Fonacier Siazon.

Geography
Laoag is located at the west-central part of the Province of Ilocos Norte bordering the South China Sea.  It is bounded on the east by the Municipality of Sarrat; in the southeast by the Municipality of San Nicolas; in the southwest by the Municipality of Paoay, in the northeast the Municipality of Vintar; in the northwest by the Municipality of Bacarra; and in the west by the South China Sea. It is one of the largest cities in the Ilocos Region.

Barangays
Laoag is politically subdivided into 80 barangays. These barangays are headed by elected officials: Barangay Captain, Barangay Council, whose members are called Barangay Councilors. All are elected every three years.

Climate
Laoag has a tropical savanna climate with warm to hot temperatures year round. Temperatures dips sightly during the winter months between December to February. Characterized by two well-pronounced seasons; dry and wet and is classified as mild and pleasant climate.  Dry season usually starts in November until April and wet during the rest of the year.  The city is shielded from northeast monsoon and trade winds by the mountain ranges of Cordillera and Sierra Madre but it is exposed to the southwest monsoon and cyclone storms.

The city experiences an average of four to five tropical cyclones every year.

Demographics

Laoag City had a total population of 94,466 for the year 2000 as per NSO official report. In 1995, the total inhabitants of the city was 88,336, an increase of 6,130. Based on the 1995 and 2000 intercensal periods, the Average Annual Growth Rate of the city was 1.35%.

The number of households is 19,751 and the average household size is five (5) persons per household. Male-female ratio is 1:1; Birth rate is 26.44% while Death rate is 4.28%.

In the city of Laoag as of year 2000, Urban barangay San Lorenzo had the largest number of population at 2,883, followed by Rural barangay Buttong at 2,277, and then by Barangay 2 Santa Joaquina at 2,048. With the least inhabitants was Rural Barangay 39 Santa Rosa, 592, and then Barangay 52-A San Mateo, 594. Noticeably, the residents of Barangay 23 San Matias decreased by 740.

Majority of ethnic population is Ilocano, whereas, the Aglipayan Church is the dominant religious affiliation, the rest are Iglesia ni Cristo, and other Protestant groups with some adherents.

Economy

Strategically located at the northern tip of the Northwestern Luzon Growth Quadrangle.  It is within two hours of jet travel to any one of East Asia's economic tigers such as Hong Kong, Mainland China, Japan, South Korea, Singapore and Taiwan by way of the Laoag International Airport if direct routes are opened and established. Having critical infrastructure such as the Laoag International Airport at Gabu and the Currimao Port makes Laoag the port of entry of goods and services complemented by an extensive road and highway system that connects it to other cities. A banking system is also found in the city with a number of twenty-five different local, domestic, and foreign banks ready to serve any financial need.

With a 12,747.35m total land area, Laoag City provides a large opportunity for economic expansion. The historic scenic tourist spots, availability of internationally competitive accommodations and facilities, and the presence of supportive national government agencies, makes Laoag an ecotourism center, as classified by the Department of Tourism. The Northwestern Luzon Growth Quadrangle – fondly called the North Quad – also aims to develop rural areas through an integrated countryside agri-industrial development approach with emphasis/focus in attaining sustainable and equitable growth; increase the productivity of agriculture and fisheries; encourage industrial competitiveness in the local and foreign markets like Taiwan, Japan, South Korea and Hong Kong. Plans are also being undertaken for the establishment of an eco-tourism village, which will showcase the rich cultural heritage of the Ilocano people and the local industries.

Laoag and the surrounding municipalities also bolster a strong workforce. At present, most industries in the city are small-scale, consisting of small-scale food-processing factories, rice mills, jewelry-making, hollow blocks factories, and metal crafts. Retail giants like SM Group with three stores, and Puregold are present within the central business district. CityMall and SM City , on the other hand, will soon to rise south of the Padsan River. Unitop, Mart One, Novo, New India, ME, 105, and JTC Mall are popular shopping centers offering affordable price. Robinsons Ilocos in neighboring San Nicolas is only 5 minutes walk from the city limits.

The city is also in the forefront of green-technology after Danish investors set-up the first wind-driven powerplant in Southeast Asia: the Bangui Wind Farm. The 25-megawatt plant cost $47.6 million US dollars. An $11 million US dollar expansion is concurrently under construction, which is set to quadruple the capacity.

Government

Laoag, belonging to the first congressional district of the province of Ilocos Norte, is governed by a mayor designated as its local chief executive and by a city council as its legislative body in accordance with the Local Government Code. The mayor, vice mayor, and the councilors are elected directly by the people through an election which is being held every three years.

Elected officials
Laoag City elected officials, term of office June 30, 2022 – June 30, 2025:

City seal

 Building and Garden  — the Ermita Garden and Building on top of the Ermita Hill.
 Bridge — formerly the Gilbert Bridge, recently renamed Marcos Bridge.
 Airport — the Gabu Airport, one of the international airports of the country.
 Tower — the Sinking Tower, one of the oldest and strongest edifices built during the early Spanish Regime.
 Monument — the Tobacco Monopoly Monument, the only one of its kind in the entire country.
 Farmer plowing — symbol of the agricultural industry of the Ilocos Region.

Tourism

Tourism has become a major economic driver of Laoag City, paving the way for new commercial investments and infrastructure development. Fort Ilocandia Resort, first and only 5-star hotel in the north, continues to attract foreign and domestic tourists. Other places of interest include a tour of heritage sites featuring Spanish colonial buildings, baroque churches, La Paz Sand Dunes, white-sand beach resorts of Pagudpud, and Marcos-era mansions.

The Laoag Cathedral was built in 1612 by Augustinian friars to replace a wooden chapel. It also serves as the seat or central church of the Roman Catholic Diocese of Laoag. Built with an Italian Renaissance, the church has an unusual two-story façade, supported by two pairs of columns on each side of the arched entrance architecture design and at the top of the facade holds a recessed niche that showcases the image of the city's patron saint, William of Maleval.

The dramatic increase in tourist arrivals also prompted the establishment of a Chinese consulate to oversee the security of Chinese citizens living or visiting the city. A new immigration policy set to simplify entry of Chinese tourists into the country by issuing visitor visas in the airport after arrival is expected to entice more guests to come. Laoag City has been named as one of the top tourist destinations in Region I and in the country.

Transportation

Laoag International Airport services flights to and from Guangzhou and Macau, as well as, domestic flights by Philippine Airlines. Foreign airlines offer direct charter flights to Laoag as part of travel packages with optional excursions to tourist sites outside of the city. Tourists can find travel agencies all over including ticket offices of several airlines in the airport terminal.

Several large bus companies serve Laoag City making connections to major and minor Philippine destinations. These transportation services are provided by GV Florida Transport, Maria de Leon Bus Lines, RCJ Lines, Partas, Fariñas Transit Company and Dominion Bus.

Mode of transport within the city includes taxi, jeepney, tricycle, and kalesa. Mini buses have daily routes to and from Pagudpud, Batac, and Vigan among others.

Education

As the provincial capital, Laoag is the center of social and economic activity with almost all major commercial and institutional establishments gravitating towards it. The importance of education in socializing its population is shared by both the local government and the private sector, which has invested heavily in the development of the academic infrastructure. The city is home to public and private schools offering elementary, secondary, and tertiary education programs. Current Philippine law requires free compulsory education to the general population from elementary to high school, as well as, subsidized tertiary education in state-ran institutions. Alternative private schools offering parallel programs to government schools are also found with additional programs to cater to students with various needs. These schools are an important component of the educational system and reflect the city's diversity as they include Chinese schools, Catholic schools, single-gender boarding schools, and military schools.

Most of the lower-level schools are government-owned and are divided into three districts, comprising a total of thirty-three primary and elementary schools. Seven private elementary schools are also present, however, most are sectarian and run by religious organizations. In addition, there are eight private and six public high schools, and significant rise of integrated schools.

In order to provide continuing education to sustain the economic momentum of the region, the government has established tertiary public learning institutions in the city: the College of Teacher Education (CTE) and the College of Industrial Technology (CIT) of the Mariano Marcos State University.

In addition, private colleges and universities are also found in the city, each with their own specialization. Private higher education institutions in the city include Northwestern University, Northern Christian College, the Divine Word College of Laoag, Data Center College of the Philippines, and Ilocos Norte College of Arts and Trades.

Also found in Laoag are four private vocational schools: STI Laoag, the Overseas Technical Institute (electronics and car maintenance), the Lazo Fashion School (cosmetology), and the Bel Arte School of Fine Arts.

The soon to open Science High School, second in Ilocos Region under DOST, is located in Barangay Vira east of bypass road.

Media

TV stations
TV5 Laoag Channel 2
GMA Laoag Channel 5
ABS-CBN Laoag Channel 7 (Now Defunct)
IBC Laoag Channel 13
ABS-CBN Sports and Action Laoag Channel 23 (Now Defunct)
GTV Laoag Channel 27
Sonshine TV Laoag Channel 35
UNTV Laoag Channel 39

Cable & Satellite
Sky Cable Laoag
Sunshine Cable TV
Cignal TV
G Sat
Sky Direct

Radio
AM stations:
DZVR Bombo Radyo 711 kHz (Bombo Radyo Philippines) 
DZJC Aksyon Radyo 747 kHz (Pacific Broadcasting Systems)
DZEA 909 kHz Radyo Totoo (Catholic Media Network)
DWFB Radyo Pilipinas 954 kHz (Philippine Broadcasting Service)
DZRH Nationwide 990 kHz (Philippine Broadcasting Corporation)
Super Radyo DWRC 1269 kHz (Radio GMA)

FM stations:
89.9 Brigada News FM  (Brigada Mass Media Corporation)
90.7 Love Radio (Philippine Broadcasting Corporation)
92.3 Magik FM (Century Broadcasting Network)
93.1 Yes The Best! (Manila Broadcasting Company)
DWAT 93.9 (Ilocos Norte College of Arts and Trades)
FMR 95.5 (Philippine Collective Media Corporation)
97.9 XFM (Southern Broadcasting Network/Yes2Health Advertising, Inc.)
99.5 iFM (Radio Mindanao Network)
DWNE 107.5 (Northwestern University)

News Programs
TV Patrol North Luzon (ABS-CBN Dagupan)
GMA Regional TV One North Central Luzon and Mornings with GMA Regional TV (GMA Dagupan)

Sister cities

  Vigan, Ilocos Sur
  Ozamiz, Misamis Occidental
  Caloocan
  Dagupan

References

Bibliography

External links

 
 [ Philippine Standard Geographic Code]
Philippine Census Information
Local Governance Performance Management System

 
Cities in Ilocos Norte
Provincial capitals of the Philippines
Populated places established in 1580
1580 establishments in the Philippines
Component cities in the Philippines